Moanin (originally titled Art Blakey and the Jazz Messengers) is a studio album by Art Blakey and the Jazz Messengers, released in January 1959 through Blue Note Records.

Background
This was Blakey's first album for Blue Note in several years, after a period of recording for a number of different labels, and marked both a homecoming and a fresh start. Originally the LP was self-titled, but the instant popularity of the bluesy opening track "Moanin'" (by pianist Bobby Timmons) led to its becoming known by that title.

Music
The rest of the originals are by saxophonist Benny Golson (who was not with the Jazz Messengers for long, this being the only American album on which he is featured). "Are You Real?" is a propulsive 32-bar piece with a four-bar tag, featuring two-part writing for Golson and trumpeter Lee Morgan. "Along Came Betty" is a more lyrical, long-lined piece, almost serving as the album's ballad. "The Drum Thunder Suite" is a feature for Blakey, in three movements: "Drum Thunder"; "Cry a Blue Tear"; and "Harlem's Disciples". "Blues March" calls on the feeling of the New Orleans marching bands, and the album finishes on its only standard, an unusually brisk reading of "Come Rain or Come Shine". Of the originals on the album, all but the "Drum Thunder Suite" became staples of the Messengers book, even after Timmons and Golson were gone. Recorded by Rudy Van Gelder in his meticulous Hackensack studios, this recording reflects the hallmark precision associated with that engineer – on the 1999 CD reissue there is a brief conversation between Lee Morgan and Rudy Van Gelder going over Morgan's solo.

Reception
The album stands as one of the archetypal hard bop albums of the era, for the intensity of Blakey's drumming and the work of Morgan, Golson and Timmons, and for its combination of old-fashioned gospel and blues influences with a sophisticated modern jazz sensibility. The album was identified by jazz critic Scott Yanow as one of "17 Essential Hard Bop Recordings". AllMusic gives it a five-star review, stating: "Moanin includes some of the greatest music Blakey produced in the studio with arguably his very best band. ... ranks with the very best of Blakey and what modern jazz offered in the late '50s and beyond."

Influence
A vocalese version of "Moanin'" was later written by Jon Hendricks, and recorded by Lambert, Hendricks & Ross, as well as jazz vocalists Bill Henderson and Karrin Allyson.

Track listing

Original LP

CD reissue

Personnel
 Art Blakey – drums
 Lee Morgan – trumpet
 Benny Golson – tenor saxophone
 Jymie Merritt – bass
 Bobby Timmons – piano

Charts

References 

1959 albums
Art Blakey albums
The Jazz Messengers albums
Blue Note Records albums
Hard bop jazz standards
Albums produced by Alfred Lion
Grammy Hall of Fame Award recipients